Cyrildene is a suburb of Johannesburg, South Africa, predominantly home to Chinese people. The area is found east of the Johannesburg CBD and is surrounded by the suburbs of Linksfield, Observatory and Bruma. It is noted for a new Chinatown that exists on Derrick Avenue. This new Chinatown is now considered as the main Chinatown in Johannesburg, replacing the declining Chinatown on Commissioner Street in the inner-city of Johannesburg. It is located in Region F of the City of Johannesburg Metropolitan Municipality.

History
The suburb is situated on part of an old Witwatersrand farm called Doornfontein. It would be proclaimed as suburb on 18 May 1938 and was named after the land developer's son, Cyril Cooper.

Up until approximately 2000 Cyrildene was a predominantly Jewish neighborhood. Unlike the old and now largely abandoned Chinatown in Newtown, which was largely made up of second or third generation South African Chinese, the new inhabitants of the Chinatown in Cyrildene are overwhelmingly first generation Chinese immigrants from mainland China. The Chinatown has a paifang (arch).

Notable residents
 L Ron Hubbard, lived in Cyrildene in the 1960s for a few months.  The house is now used as a museum honoring L Ron Hubbard's contributions to South African peace. It is also used as a recruitment centre of the Church of Scientology. The house, at 40 Hannaben Street, was built in 1951 for the a Greek timber merchant called Manos Broulidakis and was designed by Frank Ludwig Jarrett.

References

Chinatowns in Africa
Chinese-South African culture
Historic Jewish communities
Jewish South African history
Johannesburg Region E
Jews and Judaism in Johannesburg